The Delta Star is a novel by author Joseph Wambaugh, published in 1983.  The book is about a group of police in the Rampart Division of the Los Angeles Police Department.  The main characters include Detective Mario Villalobos and The Bad Czech.

An excerpt was featured in the February 1983 issue of Playboy.

Kirkus Reviews wrote that it was "sorely uneven, but undeniably vivid and occasionally inspired."

References

1983 American novels
Novels by Joseph Wambaugh
Novels set in Los Angeles
Fictional portrayals of the Los Angeles Police Department
William Morrow and Company books